Gâlgău is a commune located in Sălaj County, Transylvania, Romania. It is composed of nine villages: Bârsău Mare (Nagyborszó), Căpâlna (Csicsókápolna), Chizeni (Közfalu), Dobrocina (Döbörcsény), Fodora (Oláhfodorháza), Frâncenii de Piatră (Kőfrinkfalva), Gâlgău, Glod (Szamossósmező) and Gura Vlădesei (Vlegyászatanya). In 2011 the total population was 2456.

Sights
 Wooden church of Gâlgău (constructed in 1658)
 Wooden church of Bârsău Mare (constructed in 1690)
 Wooden church of Fodora (constructed in 1817)

References

External links

Communes in Sălaj County
Localities in Transylvania